The National Observatory of Outsider Art is a joint Department of the University of Verona, Faculty of Arts (Academy of Fine Arts, Verona).
The Academy of Fine Arts of Verona (Italian name: Accademia di Belle Arti Gian Bettino Cignaroli di Verona) is a post-secondary school for studies in the visual arts, founded in 1764. One of the oldest Art Academy in the world, the Accademia Cignaroli is listed among the five Academie Storiche d'Italia (Italian Historic Academies).

External links
 University of Verona Official Site

Verona
University of Verona
Educational institutions established in 1982
1982 establishments in Italy

fr:Université de Vérone
id:Universitas Verona
it:Università degli Studi di Verona
pt:Universidade de Verona
vec:Università de Verona